is a Japanese former football player.

Playing career
Yoneyama was born in Kanagawa Prefecture on June 27, 1974. After graduating from high school, he joined Yokohama Flügels in 1993. He did not play until 1994, having his first match in June 1995 and playing many matches as a midfielder. He did not play at all in 1996. Although he played several matches in 1997, he retired at the end of the 1997 season.

Club statistics

References

External links

1974 births
Living people
Association football people from Kanagawa Prefecture
Japanese footballers
J1 League players
Yokohama Flügels players
Association football midfielders